Minuscule 36 (in the Gregory-Aland numbering), A20 (von Soden). It is a Greek minuscule manuscript of the New Testament, written on vellum. Paleographically it has been assigned to the 12th century. It has complex contents and full marginalia.

Description 

The codex contains the complete text of the four Gospels on 509 parchment leaves. The text is written in 1 column per page, 19 lines per page.

There is also a division according to the Ammonian Sections, with references to the Eusebian Canons.

It contains a questionable scholion to the Longer ending of Mark.

Text 

The Greek text of the codex is a representative of the Byzantine text-type. Aland placed it in Category V.

It was not examined by the Claremont Profile Method.

In Luke 16:19 the manuscript has scholion on a margin of uncertain date ευρον δε τινες και του πλουσιου εν τισιν αντιγραφοις τουνομα Νινευης λεγομενον. The same scholion has manuscript 37. Now we have only one Greek manuscript with textual variant ονοματι Ν[ιν]ευης (with the name N[in]eue) in Luke 16:19 - Papyrus 75. This reading has also Sahidic version.

History 

The manuscript was dated by Scholz to the 11th, Gregory to the 10th century. Currently it has been assigned by the INTF to the 12th century.

The manuscript was held in the monastery Great Lavra of in Mount Athos (St. Athanasius). It came from the Athos to the France.

Montfaucon was the first who examined and described the manuscript. Then it was examined and described by Wettstein, Scholz, and Paulin Martin. The text of the Revelation was collated by Hoskier (1929).

It was added to the list of the New Testament manuscripts by Wettstein. C. R. Gregory saw the manuscript in 1885.

It is currently housed at the Bibliothèque nationale de France (Coislin Gr. 20) at Paris.

See also 

 List of New Testament minuscules
 Biblical manuscripts
 Textual criticism

Notes

References

Further reading 

 T. K. Abbott, "Hermaneia" 10 (London, 1882), pp. 151–153.

Greek New Testament minuscules
12th-century biblical manuscripts
Fonds Coislin